Bruce Tyrone Maxwell III (born December 20, 1990) is a German–born American professional baseball catcher for the Piratas de Campeche of the Mexican League. He has played in Major League Baseball (MLB) for the Oakland Athletics.

Maxwell is the first MLB player to join other US athletes protesting racial injustice by kneeling during the national anthem.

Early life

Maxwell was born on a U.S. military installation in Wiesbaden, Germany, while his father, Bruce Jr., was stationed there with the U.S. Army during a tour of duty. He is a Biracial-American, Father African-American, Mother White-American.

Maxwell played first base at Sparkman High School in Alabama. He then played first base and catcher in college baseball at Division III Birmingham–Southern College in Alabama.

Professional career

Oakland Athletics
The Oakland Athletics selected Maxwell in the second round of the 2012 Major League Baseball draft. He made his debut that year with the AZL Athletics, and was promoted to the Vermont Lake Monsters of the Low-A New York-Pennsylvania League after six games. For Vermont, he batted .254 with 22 RBIs and was charged with 18 passed balls in 38 games. In 2013, playing for both the Beloit Snappers in the Single-A Midwest League and the Stockton Ports in the High-A California League, he was charged with 17 passed balls. He caught 16% of attempted base-stealers, as runners stole 103 bases against him while he caught 19, in 83 games. He batted .275 with seven home runs and 49 RBIs in 104 games between both teams.

In 2014, Maxwell batted .243/.334/.334 between Stockton and the Midland RockHounds of the Double-A Texas League, as he gave up 19 passed balls in 102 games. In 2015, he spent the whole season at Midland, batting .243/.321/.308 in 96 games.

2016
Maxwell began 2016 with the Nashville Sounds of the Triple-A Pacific Coast League.

Maxwell was called up to the majors for the first time on July 23, 2016. He made his major league debut that night. In 60 games for Nashville prior to his promotion, he was batting .321 with ten home runs and 41 RBIs. He spent the remainder of the season with Oakland after his promotion and batted .283/.337/.402 in 33 games. For the season, runners were 8–0 in stolen base attempts against him.

2017
Maxwell began 2017 with Nashville and was recalled and optioned multiple times before he was called up to Oakland for the remainder of the season on June 22. In 76 games for Oakland, he batted .237 with three home runs and 22 RBIs.

On September 23, 2017, Maxwell became the first MLB player to join other US athletes protesting racial injustice by kneeling during the national anthem;  Maxwell placed his hand over his heart, and teammate Mark Canha stood next to Maxwell and put a hand on his shoulder in support. Maxwell's actions came in response to President Donald Trump's comments that professional football franchise owners should fire players who knelt during the anthem. On Twitter and through his agent, Maxwell said his decision to kneel represented concern for racial injustice as well as freedom of speech and exercise of peaceful protest. The Oakland Athletics immediately issued a statement saying the team "pride[s] ourselves on being inclusive" and supports "players' constitutional rights and freedom of expression." While supported by the A's, Maxwell's future career in the MLB was seen as impacted by the reaction to his kneeling. He remained the only MLB player to protest by kneeling until 2020, when the league allowed for "Black Lives Matter" patches and organized league-wide kneeling for social justice in the aftermath of the nationwide protests of the murder of George Floyd by police in Minneapolis.

Subsequently, Maxwell said that while eating at a restaurant with a city councilman with whom he had attended high school, Devyn Keith, and another friend in Maxwell's hometown of Huntsville, Alabama, a waiter objected to Maxwell's protest and refused to serve their table. The waiter denied the story, saying he did not know who Maxwell was.

2018
Maxwell began 2018 with Oakland. He was placed on the restricted list on May 16 when the Athletics entered Canada to play the Toronto Blue Jays, as he was not eligible for entry into Canada as he had not yet been sentenced for his assault with a deadly weapon charge that was placed in the previous off-season. He was designated for assignment on September 1, 2018. For the season with the A's, he batted .182/.207/.309 with one home run. He elected free agency on November 2, 2018.

Acereros de Monclova
On March 6, 2019, Maxwell signed with the Acereros de Monclova of the Mexican League. He was successful in his first season with the club, slashing .325/.407/.559 with 24 home runs and 112 RBIs across 109 games played. Maxwell was also selected to the LMB All-Star Game and won the Serie del Rey with the Acereros, which was the first-ever championship for the team.

Maxwell re-signed with the Acereros de Monclova for the 2020 season. However, due to the COVID-19 pandemic, the season was canceled.

New York Mets
On July 27, 2020, the New York Mets signed Maxwell to a minor-league deal, pending physical and a negative COVID-19 test. Maxwell did not play in a game in 2020 due to the cancellation of the minor league season because of the COVID-19 pandemic. He re-signed with the Mets on a new minor league deal on November 2, 2020. In 9 games for the Triple-A Syracuse Mets in 2021, Maxwell slashed .174/.355/.348 with 1 home run and 6 RBI.

San Francisco Giants
On June 5, 2021, Maxwell was traded to the San Francisco Giants in exchange for cash considerations. Maxwell underwent Tommy John surgery in July and missed the remainder of the season. In 9 games for the Double-A Richmond Flying Squirrels, Maxwell had gone 8-for-34 with 1 home run and 6 RBI. Maxwell elected minor league free agency following the season on November 7, 2021. In December 2021, he signed with the sports & entertainment agency LAA Sports & Entertainment

Acereros de Monclova (second stint)

On January 14, 2022, Maxwell signed with the Acereros de Monclova of the Mexican League for the 2022 summer season. Assigned to the Acereros de Monclova on May 20, 10 Months after undergoing Tommy John surgery, Maxwell successfully slashed .365/.472/.615 with 10 home runs and 37 RBIs across 44 games played.

Piratas de Campeche
On March 16, 2023, Maxwell was traded to the Piratas de Campeche of the Mexican League.

International career

Cañeros de Los Mochis
On June 16, 2022, Maxwell was drafted by the Cañeros de Los Mochis of the Liga Mexicana del Pacífico for the 2022 winter season.
On August 13, 2022, Maxwell's signing was confirmed  marking his second stint with the league after briefly playing for the Charros de Jalisco in the 2019 winter season.

World Baseball Classic (WBC)
Maxwell has represented team Germany at the World Baseball Classic Qualifiers for three cycles (2016, 2020(Canceled),and 2022).

Awards and Honors

Personal life
On October 28, 2017, Maxwell was accused of pointing a firearm at a food delivery driver delivering food to him at his home in Scottsdale, Arizona late at night. Maxwell was arrested on a felony charge of aggravated assault with a deadly weapon. On July 2, 2018, he was sentenced to two years probation for disorderly conduct.

References

External links

1990 births
Living people
Acereros de Monclova players
African-American baseball players
Águilas Cibaeñas players
American expatriate baseball players in the Dominican Republic
American expatriate baseball players in Mexico
American expatriates in Germany
Arizona League Athletics players
Baseball players from Alabama
Beloit Snappers players
Birmingham–Southern Panthers baseball players
Major League Baseball catchers
Major League Baseball players from Germany
Mesa Solar Sox players
Midland RockHounds players
Nashville Sounds players
Oakland Athletics players
Stockton Ports players
Sportspeople from Huntsville, Alabama
Sportspeople from Wiesbaden
Toros del Este players
Vermont Lake Monsters players
Syracuse Mets players
21st-century African-American sportspeople